Community Land Scotland is a charity and membership organisation for community landowners and aspiring community landowners. It was founded in 2010 to represent the interests of community landowners, promote legislation which empowers communities and provide a point of contact for community bodies interested in community land ownership.

Its members are estimated to own approximately 560,000 acres of land in the country.

Objectives
Community Land Scotland states its main objectives as follows:

 Facilitate the exchange of information, enabling groups to learn from each other's experience and successes
 Promote the growing importance of the community landowning sector to Scotland
 Reform The Land Reform (Scotland) Act 2003 to simplify and strengthen powers to communities
 Encourage community groups to register an interest in land
 Work with communities to ease the process of communities taking ownership of public land

See also
 Land Reform in Scotland

References

Charities based in Scotland
Community organizations
Organisations based in Inverclyde
Greenock
Organisations based in the Outer Hebrides
Land reform in Scotland
2010 establishments in Scotland
Organizations established in 2010